Xu Li (born December 17, 1989 in Suzhou, Anhui) is a female Chinese freestyle wrestler who competed at the 2008 Summer Olympics and received the silver medal in the 55 kg weight class.

She also placed first at the 2007 Women's Wrestling World Cup.

External links
 profile

1989 births
Living people
Olympic silver medalists for China
Olympic wrestlers of China
Chinese female sport wrestlers
People from Suzhou, Anhui
Wrestlers at the 2008 Summer Olympics
Olympic medalists in wrestling
Sportspeople from Anhui
Medalists at the 2008 Summer Olympics
21st-century Chinese women